Canberra is the capital city of Australia. It may also refer to:

Aircraft
 English Electric Canberra, a British jet bomber 
 Martin B-57 Canberra, a version produced in the United States
 de Havilland Giant Moth or Canberra, a 1920s biplane transport
 Canberra, a Giant Moth used by Les Holden for a charter operation based in Sydney, Australia

Ships
 HMAS Canberra (D33), a County-class cruiser launched in 1927
 HMAS Canberra (FFG 02), an Adelaide-class guided missile frigate launched in 1978
 HMAS Canberra (L02), lead vessel of the Canberra-class landing helicopter docks, launched in 2011
 PS Canberra, a paddle steamer built in 1912
 SS Canberra, an ocean liner that served in the Falklands war
 USS Canberra (CA-70), a Baltimore-class cruiser of the United States Navy
 USS Canberra (LCS-30), a littoral combat ship of the United States Navy (under construction)

Places
 Civic, Australian Capital Territory, Canberra’s central business district
 Division of Canberra, an Australian electoral division
 Canberra Avenue, Canberra
 Canberra Parish, a former parish of Murray County, New South Wales, Australia
 Canberra MRT station, Singapore

Sports
 Canberra Raiders, an Australian rugby league club
 Canberra FC, an Australian football club
 Canberra International, a women's tennis tournament held in Canberra, Australia (2001-2006)

Other uses
 University of Canberra
 Hotel Canberra, Canberra, Australia

See also
 Canberra Deep Space Communications Complex, Tidbinbilla, near Canberra, Australia
 Canberra distance, a distance function
 City of Canberra (disambiguation)